Jonathan Estrada Campillo (born 27 January 1983) is a Colombian footballer who plays as a midfielder.

Club career
Born in Medellín, Antioquia Department, Estrada made his professional debut aged 18, with Envigado Fútbol Club, being an automatic first-choice from an early age. His first game came on 5 August 2001 in a 4–1 away win against Once Caldas, where he also scored.

In January 2007, Estrada moved to Millonarios F.C. of Bogotá. In that year's Copa Sudamericana, he helped with two goals from ten appearances to an eventual last-four finish.

In June 2009, Estrada signed a one-year loan with Spain's Real Sociedad, which was managed by former Millonarios coach Martín Lasarte. During the season, as the club returned to La Liga after a three-year absence, he played less than one third of the matches, and subsequently returned to Millonarios.

Estrada moved abroad again on 7 January 2011, joining Avaí Futebol Clube in Brazil.

International career
Estrada played with Colombia at under-17, under-20 and under-23 levels. He was called to the full squad for the first time in 2007, playing the entire 4–0 friendly away win over Panama on 9 May.

Club statistics

References

External links

1983 births
Living people
Footballers from Medellín
Colombian footballers
Association football midfielders
Categoría Primera A players
Envigado F.C. players
Millonarios F.C. players
Independiente Medellín footballers
Patriotas Boyacá footballers
Deportes Tolima footballers
Atlético Junior footballers
Atlético Bucaramanga footballers
Segunda División players
Real Sociedad footballers
Campeonato Brasileiro Série A players
Avaí FC players
Colombia international footballers
Colombian expatriate footballers
Expatriate footballers in Spain
Expatriate footballers in Brazil